Apatelodes imparata is a species of moth in the family Apatelodidae. It is found in Paraguay.

References

Natural History Museum Lepidoptera generic names catalog

Apatelodidae
Moths described in 1907